John Clarence Stewart (born August 16, 1988) is an American actor and singer, best known for his role as Simon on Zoey's Extraordinary Playlist (2020-21). Prior to that, Stewart was recognized for portraying Alex Wesley on Luke Cage (2016–18) and Lionel on What/If (2019).

Early life 
Stewart was born in 1987 in Stone Mountain, Georgia. He initially attended Shiloh High School before transferring to George Walton Academy on a football scholarship for one year. His senior year he transferred back to Shiloh High School. He performed in his school musical Once on This Island. He attended Columbus State University, graduating in 2009 with a BFA in Performance Theater. He then attended Kennesaw State University, graduating in 2012 with a BA in Theater and Performance Studies and Dance. Thereafter he performed educational theatre for Kaiser Permanente in Atlanta. Along with many plays at the Alliance Theater, including The Whipping Man, Choir Boy, A Christmas Carol. He also taught and in the summer camp. While working on Choir Boy John understudied the production at Manhattan Theatre Club, the same production was a co-pro with the Alliance Theatre.  John premiered the role of Trey in Brownsville Song B-Side for Trey at Actors Theatre of Louisville. Before moving to New York John also performed in Bull Durham the Musical at the Alliance. At 24 years old, he moved to New York City and then to Los Angeles to further pursue acting.

Career 
Stewart made his professional debut portraying John in The Whipping Man (2013) at the Alliance Theatre. He performed in a couple more of the theatre's productions and also starred as Tray in Brownsville Song (B-Side for Tray) (2014) at the Actors Theatre of Louisville, and as Wanre in Fit for a Queen (2016) at the Classical Theatre of Harlem.

In 2015, Stewart made his television debut in Gotham as Officer Griffin Katz. He continued appearing in guest roles on several television shows and his first major television role was as Alex Wesley in Luke Cage (2016–2018). In 2019, he gained further recognition for portraying Lionel in the Netflix TV series What/If (2019). In 2020, he made his breakthrough portraying Simon in Zoey's Extraordinary Playlist.

Filmography

Television

References

External links 
 
 
 

1988 births
Living people
Actors from Atlanta
21st-century American male actors
American male film actors
American male stage actors
American male television actors
Place of birth missing (living people)
African-American male actors
21st-century African-American male singers